State Highway 339 (SH 339) is a state highway that runs from just south of Freer in southern Texas southeast and south to a point midway between Falfurrias and Hebbronville.

History
The route was originally designated on January 14, 1941, as the part of the highway from Freer to a point approximately ten miles south of Benavides. On December 1, 1953, FM 1345 was signed as SH 339. A short portion of the route, less than a mile of the road south of Benavides, was cancelled from the designation on October 25, 1954. On August 29, 1990, the highway assumed its present configuration with the southward extension to SH 285, transferred from Farm to Market Road 1345.

Route description
Beginning at a junction with SH 16 south of Freer in Duval County, SH 339 runs southeast to a junction with SH 359 at Benavides. In Benavides the highway is known by three different names: West Avenue north of the junction with SH 359, Main Street for the brief co-routing with SH 359, and Humble Street south of SH 359. The highway then proceeds almost directly south to its final junction with SH 285 midway between Falfurrias and Hebbronville. Most of the terrain covered by the highway is sparsely populated ranch country. SH 339 is completely contained in Duval County.

Junction list

References

339
Transportation in Duval County, Texas